State Highway 35 (SH 35)  is a state highway in the U.S. state of Texas, maintained by the Texas Department of Transportation (TxDOT). It runs primarily south–north, paralleling the Gulf of Mexico for much of its length, from a junction with Interstate 37 in Corpus Christi to Interstate 45 in southeastern Houston.

Route description
The southern terminus of SH 35 is at an interchange with Interstate 37 (I-37) near downtown Corpus Christi, concurrent with U.S. Route 181 (US 181). The two highways run as a freeway near Corpus Christi Bay before crossing Nueces Bay on the Corpus Christi Harbor Bridge and entering Portland. In Gregory, the two routes separate, with US 181 traveling towards Sinton, and the freeway segment of SH 35 ends shortly thereafter. After crossing FM 136, SH 35 runs eastward to Aransas Pass before turning towards the northeast. In Rockport, SH 35 runs as a divided expressway. After passing through Fulton, the highway crosses Copano Bay. SH 35 runs along the western edge of the Aransas National Wildlife Refuge before entering Refugio County. In Calhoun County, SH 35 has a junction with US 87 in Port Lavaca before crossing Lavaca Bay. The route then runs east to Palacios before turning north toward Blessing, where it resumes its northeasterly trajectory toward Bay City and Angleton. From here, SH 35 takes a turn to the north-northwest toward Alvin before heading north through Pearland and crossing the Sam Houston Tollway (Beltway 8) into Houston. SH 35 then crosses I-610 before reaching its northern terminus at I-45.

History
SH 35 was originally proposed on November 19, 1917 as a route from Paris to Houston. On September 17, 1918, the section of the road from Liberty to Houston was cancelled (as it overlapped SH 12), and the road was rerouted south to Anahuac. On January 20, 1919, the highway was rerouted through Coldspring, Cleveland, and Humble to end in Houston, while the old route was replaced by the new SH 35A. On August 21, 1923, the northern half of the highway had been renumbered as SH 49, with the new northern end now going east to the Louisiana border. On November 14, 1927, it extended to Alvin. On April 10, 1934, it had been extended southwest along cancelled SH 58 and SH 57, ending in Gregory. SH 35 Spur was designated from 35 to the Retrieve Prison Farm. This SH 35 Spur was cancelled on July 15, 1935. On February 21, 1938, a new SH 35 Spur was designated to Danbury, as SH 35 was rerouted to bypass Danbury. On September 26, 1939, the section north of Houston was removed when it was renumbered as U.S. Highway 59 and U.S. Highway 84. SH 35 Spur was renumbered as Spur 28. On October 5, 1972, SH 35 was extended to Corpus Christi along US 181. On January 15, 1986, an Angleton bypass opened, with the old route becoming Loop 558. On February 25, 1987, SH 35 was rerouted back over Loop 558, and the bypass became Loop 558 instead (now FM 523). On April 27, 1995, another bypass opened, so that SH 35 no longer goes through Aransas Pass or Rockport. On March 29, 2007, an Old Ocean bypass opened, with the old route becoming Loop 419 (now Spur 419).

SH 35A was a proposed spur route off SH 35 designated on March 18, 1918, with a route splitting off at Livingston, and travelling west to New Waverly.  On January 20, 1919, the section of SH 35A south of Coldspring was cancelled, and the section north of Coldspring became the main route. The section of SH 35 from Livingston via Liberty to Anahuac was routed through Devers and was renamed SH 35A. On August 21, 1923, the section from Anahuac to Devers was renumbered as SH 61, and the section north of Devers was cancelled. By 1928, the Livingston to Liberty section was restored as SH 132. By 1933, that became a portion of SH 146.

SH 35B was a spur of SH 35 designated on November 27, 1922 from Jefferson to the Louisiana border. On August 21, 1923, this was renumbered as SH 49.

Future
In Houston, SH 35 is Telephone Road and Reveille Street from its northern terminus at I-45. An upgrade of the facility (in a slightly different corridor) to freeway standards is planned, tentatively named the Alvin Freeway. As of 2006, only  had been built, under the sign Spur 5 (constructed between 1996–99; officially opened September 1999; designated 1998).  However, the mainlanes extend less than half a mile south of Interstate 45 adjacent to the University of Houston campus.

An overlap of SH 35 with the Gulf Freeway was also constructed in the 1980s. This section contains three elevated lanes in each direction (briefly four southbound lanes near the southern terminus). This overlap section is 22 lanes wide, including mainlanes, feeder roads, and a reversible HOV lane.

Once built, the Alvin Freeway is planned to follow a corridor near Mykawa Road from the terminus to Beltway 8 before returning to its normal undivided state.

Business routes
SH 35 has four business routes and one former business route.

Alvin business loop

Business State Highway 35-C (Bus. SH 35-C), formerly Loop 409, is a  business loop that runs through Alvin. The road was bypassed on April 1, 1965, by SH 35 and designated Loop 409. The road was redesignated as Business SH 35-C on June 21, 1990.

West Columbia business loop

Business State Highway 35-E (Bus. SH 35-E) is a  business loop that runs through West Columbia. The route was created in 1998 when SH 35 was rerouted north and west of town.

Palacios business loop

Business State Highway 35-H (Bus SH 35-H), formerly Loop 141, is a  business loop that runs through Palacios. The road was bypassed on September 21, 1944 by SH 35 and designated Loop 141. The road was redesignated as Business SH 35-H on June 21, 1990.

Rockport–Aransas Pass business loop

Business State Highway 35-L (Bus. SH 35-L), formerly Loop 70, is a  business loop that runs through Rockport. The road was created in 1939 when SH 35 was rerouted south and east of town. The route was redesignated as Business SH 35-L on June 21, 1990. On April 27, 1995 the route was extended north to SH 35 and FM 3036 and south to SH 35 in Aransas Pass over former SH 35 and was also rerouted in Rockport with the old route redesignated as Loop 70.

Former Aransas Pass business loop

Business State Highway 35-M (Bus. SH 35-M), formerly Loop 81, was a  business loop that ran through Aransas Pass. The route was created in 1939 when SH 35 was rerouted in the city. The route was redesignated as Business SH 35-M on June 21, 1990, but was redesignated as Loop 90 on April 27, 1995.

Junction list
All exits are unnumbered.

See also
 Copano Bay Fishing Pier

References

External links

035
Transportation in Harris County, Texas
Transportation in Brazoria County, Texas
Transportation in Matagorda County, Texas
Transportation in Jackson County, Texas
Transportation in Calhoun County, Texas
Transportation in Refugio County, Texas
Transportation in Aransas County, Texas
Transportation in San Patricio County, Texas
Transportation in Nueces County, Texas